Hollens is a surname. Notable people with the surname include:

Evynne Hollens (born 1977), American singer
Peter Hollens (born 1982), American singer-songwriter, producer and entrepreneur